is a Latin saying that means "money does not stink". The phrase is ascribed to the Roman emperor Vespasian (ruled AD 69–79).

History

The tax was removed after a while, but it was re-enacted by Vespasian around 70 AD in order to fill the treasury.

Vespasian imposed a urine tax on the distribution of urine from Rome's public urinals (the Roman lower classes urinated into pots, which were later emptied into cesspools). The urine collected from these public urinals was sold as an ingredient for several chemical processes. It was used in tanning, wool production, and also by launderers as a source of ammonia to clean and whiten woollen togas. The buyers of the urine paid the tax.

The Roman historian Suetonius reports that when Vespasian's son Titus complained about the disgusting nature of the tax, his father held up a gold coin and asked whether he felt offended by its smell. When Titus said "No", Vespasian replied, "Yet it comes from urine". 

The phrase  is still used today to say that the value of money is not tainted by its origins. Vespasian's name still attaches to public urinals in Italy and France.

In literature
"Vespasian's axiom" is also referred to in passing in the Balzac short story Sarrasine in connection with the mysterious origins of the wealth of a Parisian family. The proverb receives some attention in Roland Barthes's detailed analysis of the Balzac story in his critical study S/Z. It is possible that F. Scott Fitzgerald alludes to Vespasian's jest in The Great Gatsby with the phrase "non-olfactory money".

In That Hideous Strength by C. S. Lewis, the Warden of Bracton College is given the nickname "Non-Olet" for having written "a monumental report on National Sanitation. The subject had, if anything, rather recommended him to the Progressive Element. They regarded it as a slap in the face for the dilettanti and Die-hards, who replied by christening their new Warden Non-Olet."

In the Pulitzer Prize–winning novel All The King's Men, by Robert Penn Warren (1946), protagonist Jack Burden muses that perhaps Vespasian had been right. At the time, Jack is beset with doubts about the source of his inheritance.

In London Fields by Martin Amis, while smelling a wad of used £50 notes, foil Guy Clinch observes, " was dead wrong. ."

In The Surgeon's Mate by Patrick O'Brian, when James Saumarez, 1st Baron de Saumarez is speaking of "glory to be picked up in the Baltic ... and in any case, who cares about filthy lucre?", one of the assembled captains murmurs "".

In Tono-Bungay by H. G. Wells, the narrator, Ponderevo uses the phrase to justify joining his uncle's business selling an ineffective and mildly harmful quack medicine: "... and true too was my uncle's proposition that the quickest way to get wealth was to sell the cheapest thing possible in the dearest bottle. He was frightfully right after all. ,—a Roman emperor said that."

See also
 List of Latin phrases

References

Sources

 Lissner, Ivar. Power and Folly: the story of the Caesars
 Suetonius. De Vita Caesarum--Divus Vespasianus
 Laporte, Dominique. History of Shit

External links
 Translation of De vita Caesarum—Divus Vespasianus
 Translation of History by Dio Cassius

Economy of ancient Rome
Urine
Latin words and phrases
History of taxation
Vespasian